Incilius tutelarius (Chimalapas toad) is a species of toad in the family Bufonidae. It is found in the Sierra Chimalapa and Sierra Madre de Chiapas (including Volcán Tacaná) in Guatemala and Chiapas, Mexico.
Its natural habitats are cloud forests and pine-oak (broadleaf) forests. It is closely associated with streams, its breeding habitat. It is threatened by habitat loss.

References

tutelarius
Amphibians of Guatemala
Amphibians of Mexico
Sierra Madre de Chiapas
Endangered biota of Mexico
Endangered fauna of North America
Amphibians described in 1997
Taxonomy articles created by Polbot